The Greek Basket League (GBL), often also referred to as the Greek A1 Basketball League, or Greek Basketball Championship (originally called Panhellenic Basketball Championship), and also known as the Stoiximan Basket League for sponsorship reasons, is the first tier level professional basketball league in Greece. It is run by HEBA, under the legal authority of the Hellenic Basketball Federation (E.O.K.).

It is the highest-tier level of the Greek league system. The GBL plays under FIBA rules and currently consists of 13 teams, with the lowest-placed team relegated to the A2 Basket League and replaced by the winner of the play-offs of that tier. It runs from October to June, with teams playing 22 games each during the regular season, and the top 8 teams then competing in the playoffs. The first official Greek Basketball Championship was held in the 1927–28 season. The league held a competition in which the teams of the league played under a format with a nationwide schedule, for the first time, in the 1963–64 season. The league first held a playoff round in the 1986–87 season. The league first allowed foreign (non-Greek) players, in the 1988–89 season. The league became a fully professional competition in the 1992–93 season.

The league has always been ranked as one of the top 3-5 level national domestic leagues in European basketball, since league rankings began. For further information, see historical European national basketball league rankings, and European national basketball league rankings.

History

Basketball first came to Greece in the year 1924. The first Greek basketball championship took place in the 1927–28 season, the first fully organized Greek basketball championship began. The league was originally organized by the Hellenic Amateur Athletic Association (SEGAS). There have been four different official championship eras. The first era was the Panhellenic Championship (Πανελλήνιο Πρωτάθλημα), which lasted from the 1927–28 to 1962–63 seasons, when the champions of every regional district played each other to decide the Greek Champion. The second era started in the 1963–64 season, when the A National Category (Α' Εθνική Κατηγορία), or Alpha National Category was founded.

In 1969, the Hellenic Basketball Federation (E.O.K.) took over the duties of overseeing the competition, and did so until the year 1992. The third era of the championship existed between the 1986–87 and 1991–92 seasons, when the first division A1 National Category (Α1 Εθνική Κατηγορία), with a regular season and playoffs, and the second division A2 National Category (Α2 Εθνική Κατηγορία) were formed. The 1988–89 season, marked the first time that Greek Basket League teams were allowed to have foreign players on their rosters.

The fourth era of the championship began in the 1992–93 season, when the Hellenic Basketball Clubs Association (HEBA) took over the competition and renamed the first division the HEBA A1 (ΕΣΑΚΕ Α1). The league was then renamed to Greek Basket League (Ελληνική Μπάσκετ Λιγκ), starting with the 2010–11 season.

The Greek League has been one of the most competitive basketball leagues in Europe through the years, and it was widely regarded as the second best national domestic league in the world, after only the NBA, in the 1990s decade. It currently ranks among the best national domestic leagues in the world (excluding the NBA), such as Liga ACB in Spain, VTB United League (counts as the domestic league for Russian clubs), and BSL in Turkey. It has always been considered one of the top 3-5 European national domestic leagues under the historical European national basketball league rankings and European national basketball league rankings.

The league has several European historical basketball powers, which also belong to some of the most traditional European basketball clubs, especially Panathinaikos,
Olympiacos and AEK (which had great success in the 1960s), which are three of the most successful European basketball clubs of all-time.
 
Also, Aris, led by Nikos Galis, Panagiotis Giannakis, and Slobodan "Lefteris" Subotić, was the dominant Greek club, and one of the most powerful European teams in the 1980s. Other clubs that have had significant success throughout the history of Greek basketball, as well as
success in European basketball, are PAOK and Panellinios.

The first five aforementioned clubs (Panathinaikos, Olympiacos, AEK, Aris and PAOK), are also the most widely supported by fans in Greece.

Despite the championship having been contested 80 times, only nine different clubs have won it so far. The dominating club has usually been Panathinaikos, having claimed the championship 39 times. Since the foundation of the Alpha National Category in the 1963–64 season, only two teams have participated in every season of the competition, Panathinaikos and Aris.

Brand

Name 
 1927–28 to 1962–63:  Panhellenic Championship
 1963–64 to 1985–86:  Alpha (A) National Category
 1986–87 to 1991–92:  Alpha1 (A1) National Category
 1992–93 to 2011–12:  HEBA Alpha1 (A1)
 2012–13 to present:  Greek Basket League

Sponsors 
 ΕΚΟ
 Betshop.gr
 Stoiximan.gr
 Spalding

Logo 
The main elements of the logo were changed in 2013.

Regulations
The championship, in its current form, has been organized since the 1992–93 season by the Hellenic Basketball Clubs Association (HEBA), under the authority of the Hellenic Basketball Federation. The fully professional Greek basketball clubs compete in the first division championship, which is often colloquially called the "A1", in which 12 teams compete for the Greek National Championship. There is also a professional level second division championship that is run entirely by the Hellenic Basketball Federation, which is called the "A2", in which 16 teams compete for the second division crown. The bottom one place finishing team each year in the A1 division standings is relegated to the A2 division, due to poor performance. While conversely, the top one teams each year from the A2 division is promoted to the A1 division, due to good performance.

Club and arena standards
In order to compete in the Greek Basket League, clubs must invest a minimum of €1 million on club operations per season. The minimum club budget per season is €800,000 euros, and each club must also invest €200,000 euros into a league-wide fund that insures players get their full salaries. Most of the league's clubs invest more than the minimum requirements in each season.

Currently, Greek Basket League clubs must play their home games in arenas with a seating capacity of at least 2,000 people, in order to play Greek domestic league games. Several Greek clubs have two arenas that they primarily use. One for domestic Greek League games, and one for European-wide games.

Greek clubs that play in European-wide competitions, such as the EuroLeague, the EuroCup, or the FIBA Champions League, must play their home games in those leagues in arenas that fit the arena standards of those leagues. Which are currently, a 5,000 seat minimum for the EuroLeague, and a 3,000 seat minimum for the EuroCup and FIBA Champions League. Although the FIBA Champions League's minimum seat rule can be waived with the league's approval.

Foreign players
Greek Basket League teams were first allowed to have foreign (non-Greek) players on their rosters in the 1988–89 season.

Under the league's current foreign player rules, Greek Basket League teams must have at least 6 Greek players on their active 12 man game rosters. Each team is allowed to have up to 6 foreign (non-Greek) players, on their active 12 man game roster. There are no restrictions on the number of foreign players allowed by country of origin. Meaning that for example, any team in the league could sign up to 6 American players, or up to 6 Canadian players, or up to 6 players from European countries, etc.

Current clubs
The clubs for the 2022–23 season:

Statistics

Title holders 

      
 1926–27:  Aris                        
 1927–28:  Iraklis 
 1928–29:  Panellinios 
 1929–30:  Aris 
 1930–34: Not held
 1934–35:  Iraklis 
 1935–36:  Near East
 1936–37: Athens University 
 1937–38: Not held
 1938–39:  Panellinios 
 1939–40:  Panellinios 
 1940–45: Not held due to World War II
 1945–46:  Panathinaikos 
 1946–47:  Panathinaikos 
 1947–48: Not held
 1948–49:  Olympiacos 
 1949–50:  Panathinaikos
 1950–51:  Panathinaikos 
 1951–52: Not held
 1952–53:  Panellinios 
 1953–54:  Panathinaikos 
 1954–55:  Panellinios 
 1955–56: Not held
 1956–57:  Panellinios 
 1957–58:  AEK 
 1958–59:  PAOK 
 1959–60:  Olympiacos 
 1960–61:  Panathinaikos 
 1961–62:  Panathinaikos 
 1962–63:  AEK 
 1963–64:  AEK 

 1964–65:  AEK 
 1965–66:  AEK 
 1966–67:  Panathinaikos 
 1967–68:  AEK  
 1968–69:  Panathinaikos 
 1969–70:  AEK 
 1970–71:  Panathinaikos 
 1971–72:  Panathinaikos 
 1972–73:  Panathinaikos 
 1973–74:  Panathinaikos 
 1974–75:  Panathinaikos 
 1975–76:  Olympiacos 
 1976–77:  Panathinaikos 
 1977–78:  Olympiacos 
 1978–79:  Aris 
 1979–80:  Panathinaikos 
 1980–81:  Panathinaikos 
 1981–82:  Panathinaikos 
 1982–83:  Aris 
 1983–84:  Panathinaikos 
 1984–85:  Aris 
 1985–86:  Aris 
 1986–87:  Aris 
 1987–88:  Aris 
 1988–89:  Aris 
 1989–90:  Aris 
 1990–91:  Aris 
 1991–92:  PAOK 
 1992–93:  Olympiacos 
 1993–94:  Olympiacos 
 1994–95:  Olympiacos 

 1995–96:  Olympiacos 
 1996–97:  Olympiacos 
 1997–98:  Panathinaikos 
 1998–99:  Panathinaikos 
 1999–00:  Panathinaikos 
 2000–01:  Panathinaikos 
 2001–02:  AEK  
 2002–03:  Panathinaikos 
 2003–04:  Panathinaikos 
 2004–05:  Panathinaikos 
 2005–06:  Panathinaikos 
 2006–07:  Panathinaikos 
 2007–08:  Panathinaikos 
 2008–09:  Panathinaikos 
 2009–10:  Panathinaikos 
 2010–11:  Panathinaikos 
 2011–12:  Olympiacos  
 2012–13:  Panathinaikos 
 2013–14:  Panathinaikos 
 2014–15:  Olympiacos  
 2015–16:  Olympiacos  
 2016–17:  Panathinaikos 
 2017–18:  Panathinaikos 
 2018–19:  Panathinaikos 
 2019–20:  Panathinaikos
 2020–21:  Panathinaikos 
 2021–22:  Olympiacos

Performance by club

A1 Finals

Basket League/A1 finals participation by club (until 2022)

Number of seasons in the Panhellenic Championship (1928–1963)
The number of times that clubs participated in the league's original format, the Panhellenic Championship.

Number of seasons in the A and A1 National Categories by club (1963–64 – 2021–22)
The number of times that clubs participated in the top A National Category, while it existed from the 1963–64 season to the 1985–86 season. As well as the number of times that clubs have participated in the top A1 National Category, since it began with the 1986–87 season. Only two clubs, Panathinaikos and Aris, have played in the top division every year since its formation.

 1963–64 to 1985–86: Alpha (A) National Category
 1986–87 to 1991–92: Alpha1 (A1) National Category
 1992–93 to 2009–10: HEBA Alpha1 (A1)
 2010–11 to present: Greek Basket League

Number of seasons in the top-tier level Greek Basket League in total (1928 to 2021–22)
The total number of times that each club has played in the top-tier level Greek Basket League, through all of its different league formats.

 1927–28 to 1962–63: Panhellenic Championship
 1963–64 to 1985–86: Alpha (A) National Category
 1986–87 to 1991–92: Alpha1 (A1) National Category
 1992–93 to 2009–10: HEBA Alpha1 (A1)
 2010–11 to present: Greek Basket League

Best regular season records in the history of the A and A1 National Categories (1963–2015)

 1963–64 to 1985–86: Alpha (A) National Category
 1986–87 to 1991–92: Alpha1 (A1) National Category
 1992–93 to 2009–10: HEBA Alpha1 (A1)
 2010–11 to present: Greek Basket League

A and A1 National Category (1963–2018)

The best overall season records of the HEBA A1 (1992–2015)

Greek basketball clubs in European and worldwide competitions

Awards and players

All-time stats leaders

Of the HEBA fully professional era Greek Basket League, 1992–93 to present. The officially recognized league stats leaders.
Through the 2022–23 season.
 Currently active players in the league in bold.

See also
 Greek Cup
 Greek Super Cup
 Greek basketball clubs in international competitions
 Greek Basket League Hall of Fame
 HEBA Greek All-Star Game
 Greek 2nd Division
 HEBA
 Basketball in Greece

References

External links
 Official website 
 Official English website 
 Greek Basket League Highlights  
 Greek Basketball (Men) Eurobasket.com 
 Official Hellenic Basketball Federation Site 

 
1
Professional sports leagues in Greece
Sports leagues established in 1927
Basketball